The 2016–17 Long Beach State 49ers men's basketball team represented California State University, Long Beach during the 2016–17 NCAA Division I men's basketball season. The 49ers were led by tenth-year head coach Dan Monson and played their home games at the Walter Pyramid as members of the Big West Conference. They finished the season 15–19, 9–7 in Big West play to finish in fourth place. They defeated Hawaii in the quarterfinals of the Big West tournament before losing to UC Irvine in the semifinals.

Previous season 
The 49ers finished the 2015–16 season 20–15, 12–4 in Big West play to finish in third place. They defeated UC Riverside and UC Irvine to advance to the championship game of the Big West tournament where they lost to Hawaii. They received an invitation to the National Invitation Tournament where they lost in the first round to Washington.

Departures

2016 incoming recruits

2017 incoming recruits

Roster

Schedule and results

|-
!colspan=9 style=| Exhibition

|-
!colspan=9 style=| Non-conference regular season

|-
!colspan=9 style=| Big West regular season

|-
!colspan=9 style=| Big West tournament

References

Long Beach State Beach men's basketball seasons
Long Beach State
Long Beach State 49ers men's basketball
Long Beach State 49ers men's basketball